Francis Paul Wilson (born May 17, 1946, in Jersey City, New Jersey) is an American medical doctor and author of horror, adventure, medical thrillers, science fiction, and other genres of literary fiction. His books include the Repairman Jack novels—including Ground Zero, The Tomb, and Fatal Error—the Adversary cycle—including The Keep—and a young adult series featuring the teenage Jack. Wilson has won the Prometheus Award, the Bram Stoker Award, the Inkpot Award from the San Diego ComiCon, and the Lifetime Achievement Award of the Horror Writers of America, among other honors. He lives in Wall, New Jersey.

Career
Wilson made his first sales in 1970 to Analog while still in medical school (graduating in 1973), and continued to write science fiction throughout the seventies. His debut novel was Healer (1976). In 1981, he ventured into the horror genre with the international bestseller The Keep, which was adapted into a film in 1983. In the 1990s, he moved from science fiction and horror to medical thrillers and interactive scripting for Disney Interactive and other multimedia companies. He, along with Matthew J. Costello, created and scripted FTL Newsfeed, which ran daily on the Sci-Fi Channel from 1992 to 1996.

Among Wilson's best-known characters is the anti-hero Repairman Jack, an urban mercenary introduced in the 1984 New York Times bestseller The Tomb. Unwilling to start a series character at the time, Wilson refused to write a second Repairman Jack novel until Legacies in 1998. Since then he has written one per year along with side trips into vampire fiction (the retro Midnight Mass), science fiction (Sims), and even a New Age thriller (The Fifth Harmonic). Current books sales are around six million.

Throughout his writing – especially in his earlier science fiction works (most notably An Enemy of the State) – Wilson has included explicitly libertarian political philosophy which extends to his "Repairman Jack" series. He won the first Prometheus Award in 1979 for his novel Wheels Within Wheels and another in 2004 for Sims. The Libertarian Futurist Society has also honored Wilson with their Hall of Fame Award for Healer (in 1990) and An Enemy of the State (in 1991). In 2015 he received the third special Prometheus Award for Lifetime Achievement; the previous two recipients were Poul Anderson and Vernor Vinge. In 2021, his "Lipidleggin'" won the Prometheus Hall of Fame Award.

Wilson is a noted fan of H. P. Lovecraft.

Why? Because HPL is special to me. Donald A. Wollheim is to blame. He started me on Lovecraft. It was 1959. I was just a kid, a mere thirteen years old when he slipped me my first fix. I was a good kid up till then, reading Ace Doubles and clean, wholesome science fiction stories by the likes of Heinlein, E. E. Smith, Poul Anderson, Fred Pohl, and the rest. But he brought me down with one anthology. He knew what he was doing. He called it The Macabre Reader and slapped this lurid neato cool Ed Emshwiller cover on it. I couldn't resist. I bought it. I read it. And that was it. The beginning of my end.

In answer to a claim that Tolkien's The Lord of the Rings was an influence on The Keep, Wilson responded:

First off, I'm not a fan of LOtR – I struggled through it once as a teen (skimming a lot) and never looked back. ... The influences on The Keep were Ludlum, R. E. Howard, and Lovecraft.

Like other American science fiction writers directly or indirectly influenced by Campbell's view of the genre as a literature of ideas, Wilson makes use of his work to explore trends and technologies speculatively as they manifest. A prominent example is his novel An Enemy of the State (published in 1980), which was written during the 1970s, an era that saw stagflation develop in the U.S. economy. Throughout the book, Wilson runs chapter headings quoting from economic works such as Fiat Money Inflation in France and KYFHO, a kind of anarchic philosophy that he invented as model for a perfect society. The protagonist La Nague was born on Tolive, where the philosophy led to a government described in detail in "The Healer".

The Keep was later made into a movie and there is much talk of a Repairman Jack film based on one of Wilson's novels.

Hate to say it (being a devout believer in Murphy's law), but The Tomb looks like it's on its way to being filmed this year. Last October, after seven years of development, numerous options, five screenwriters, and eight scripts, Beacon Films (Air Force One, Thirteen Days, Spy Game, etc.) finally bought film rights. Disney/Touchstone/Buena Vista will be partnering and distributing the film here and abroad. The film will be called Repairman Jack (the idea is to make him a franchise character).

His short stories "Foet", "Traps", and "Lipidleggin'" were filmed as short films and collected on the DVD OTHERS: The Tales of F. Paul Wilson.

His short story "Pelts" was adapted into the season 2 episode of Masters of Horror titled "Pelts".

Short stories "Definitive Therapy" (published in "The Further Adventures of the Joker") and "Hunters" (published in "Soft and others") were adapted as short films.

In January 2012, Wilson began writing for the tech web site Byte, mostly in the persona of Repairman Jack.

Wilson has been a resident of Wall Township, New Jersey. He is a practicing physician as a Doctor of Osteopathic Medicine.

Novels

The Adversary Cycle

 The Keep (1981), 
 The Tomb (1984),  (re-released in 2004 under its original title, Rakoshi, by Borderlands Press)
 The Touch (1986), 
 Reborn (1990),  (revised edition in 2009)
 Reprisal (1991),  (revised edition in 2011)
 Nightworld (1992),  (revised edition in 2012)
 Signalz (2020) (a prelude to Nightworld)

Repairman Jack

 "Fix" (novella) (with J.A. Konrath and Ann Voss Peterson) 
 The Tomb (1984),  (re-released in 2004 under its original title, Rakoshi, by Borderlands Press)
 "A Day in the Life" (short story) (1989) (available in The Barrens and Others and Quick Fixes- Tales of Repairman Jack)
 "The Last Rakosh" (1990) (later incorporated into All The Rage, then in 2006 as revised hardcover and paperback editions; also available in Quick Fixes- Tales of Repairman Jack)
 "The Long Way Home" (short story; available in Quick Fixes- Tales of Repairman Jack) (1992)
 "Home Repairs" (short story) (1996) (later incorporated into Conspiracies; also available in Quick Fixes- Tales of Repairman Jack)
 "The Wringer" (short story) (1996) (later incorporated into Fatal Error; also available in Quick Fixes- Tales of Repairman Jack)
 Legacies (1998), 
 Conspiracies (1999), 
 All The Rage (2000), 
 Hosts (2001), 
 The Haunted Air (2002), 
 Gateways (2003), 
 Crisscross (2004), 
 Infernal (2005), 
 Harbingers (2006), 
 "Interlude at Duane's" (short story) (2006) (available in the James Patterson–edited anthology Thriller, Aftershock and Others, and in Quick Fixes- Tales of Repairman Jack)
 "Infernal Night" (short story) (with Heather Graham) (available in FaceOff, and also independently published)
 Bloodline (2007), 
 "Do-Gooder" (short short) (2007) (a 200-copy limited one-sheet "short short"; available in Quick Fixes- Tales of Repairman Jack)
 By The Sword (2008), 
 Ground Zero (2009), 
 "Recalled" (short story) (2009) (available in Richard Matheson tribute book He is Legend as a crossover with Matheson's "The Distributor"; also available in Quick Fixes- Tales of Repairman Jack)
 Fatal Error (2010), 
 The Dark at the End (2011), 
 Quick Fixes- Tales of Repairman Jack (contains "A Day in the Life", "The Last Rakosh", "Home Repairs", "The Long Way Home", "The Wringer", "Interlude at Duane's", "Do-Gooder", "Recalled", "and "Piney Power") (2011), 
  The heavily revised (2012) version of Nightworld is styled as "a Repairman Jack novel" and marks the end of the RJ and Adversary cycles.
 "Santa Jack: (short story) (2013) (excerpted from Legacies)
 The Last Christmas (2019, an interlude that takes place between Ground Zero and Fatal Error.

Young Repairman Jack
 Secret Histories (young adult novel) (2008)
 Secret Circles (young adult novel) (2010)
 Secret Vengeance (young adult novel) (2011)

Early Repairman Jack
 Cold City (2012)
 Dark City (2013)
 Fear City (2014)

LaNague Federation
 Healer (1976),  (reprinted in 2005, includes "To Fill the Sea and Air" )
 Wheels Within Wheels (1978),  (revised/reprinted in 2005, includes "Higher Centers" and "The Man with the Anteater" )
 An Enemy of the State (1980),  (reprinted in 2005, includes "Lipidleggin'" and "Ratman" )
 Dydeetown World (1989), 
 The Tery (1990),  (revised in 2006)
The LaNague Chronicles (1992),  (includes An Enemy of the State, Wheels Within Wheels and Healer)
The Complete LaNague (2013) (includes "Lipidleggin’", An Enemy of the State, Dydeetown World, The Tery, "To Fill the Sea and Air", "The Man with the Anteater", "Higher Centers", "Wheels Within Wheels", "Ratman", and Healer)

Nocturnia Chronicles
 Definitely Not Kansas (2015) (with Thomas F. Monteleone)
 Family Secrets (2016) (with Thomas F. Monteleone)
 The Silent Ones (2018) (with Thomas F. Monteleone)

The ICE Sequence
  Panacea (2016)
  The God Gene (2018)
 The Void Protocol (2019)

Other books
 Demonsong (1970s), (prehistory) free download: http://www.smashwords.com/books/view/23892
 Black Wind (1988), 
 Soft and Others (1989),  (short story collection)
 Sibs (1991),  [US] aka Sister Night (1993)  [UK]
 Freak Show (1992),  (contributor and editor)
 The Select (1993), 
 Implant (1995) (writing as Colin Andrews), 
 Virgin (1996) (writing as Mary Elizabeth Murphy), 
 Mirage (1996),  (with Matthew J. Costello)
 Deep as the Marrow (1997) (writing as Colin Andrews), 
 Nightkill (1997),  (with Steven Spruill) (some editions show "Steve Lyon")
 Masque (1998),  (with Matthew J. Costello) (note: ebook release has been retitled DNA Wars)
 The Barrens and Others (1998),  (short story collection)
 The Fifth Harmonic (2003), 
 Sims (2003), 
 Artifact (2003),  (with Kevin J. Anderson, Janet Berlinger and Matthew J. Costello)
 The Christmas Thingy (2004),  (children's story illustrated by Alan M. Clark)
 Midnight Mass (2004), 
 The Peabody-Ozymandias Traveling Circus & Oddity Emporium (2007)
 Aftershock and Others (2009), (short story collection)
 The Proteus Cure (2013) (with Tracy L. Carbone)
 Wayward Pines: The Widow Lindley (Novella)
 A Necessary End (2014) (with Sarah Pinborough)
 Wardenclyffe (2018)
 Secret Stories: Tales from the Secret History (2019) (short story collection)
 Double Threat (2021)
 Rx Murder (2021) (writing as Nina Abbott)
 Rx Mayham (2022) (as Nina Abbott)

References

External links

 Official Repairman Jack site
 
 F. Paul Wilson at Tor Books
 
 A fan-created Wiki

Interviews
 Interview with Free Talk Live 
 Interview on wotmania.com
 Interview at World Horror Convention 2011
 Interview with Rodger Nichols (2018) The God Gene

Film version of The Keep
 The Keep – Includes interviews with F. Paul Wilson, Michael Mann and Enki Bilal, creator of the visual given to "Molasar," the film version of The Keep's villain.
 The alternative endings  of the movie.
 A comical —Parody page about the movie adaptation of The Keep

20th-century American male writers
20th-century American novelists
20th-century American short story writers
21st-century American male writers
21st-century American novelists
21st-century American short story writers
American horror writers
American male novelists
American male short story writers
American primary care physicians
American science fiction writers
Inkpot Award winners
Living people
Novelists from New Jersey
People from Wall Township, New Jersey
Weird fiction writers
Writers from Jersey City, New Jersey
Xavier High School (New York City) alumni